Robert Knight (Bob) Andras,  (February 21, 1921 – November 17, 1982) was a Canadian politician. He represented the electoral districts of Port Arthur from 1965 to 1979, and Thunder Bay—Nipigon from 1979 to 1980, in the House of Commons of Canada as a member of the Liberal Party of Canada.

He was born February 21, 1921, in Lachine, Quebec. Andras moved to Port Arthur, Ontario in 1958 as the general manager of Gibson Motors Ltd., a car dealership he assumed ownership of in 1960.

He held a number of cabinet positions in the government of Pierre Trudeau. He was Minister without Portfolio from 1968 to 1971, Minister of State for Urban Affairs from 1971 to 1972, Minister of Consumer and Corporate Affairs in 1972, Minister of Manpower and Immigration from 1972 to 1976, President of the Treasury Board from 1976 to 1978, and Minister of State for Economic Development from 1978 to 1979.

As Minister without Portfolio in 1968–1971, Andras started working with Minister of Northern Affairs, Jean Chrétien to determine the future of Indian policy.  He attended consultation meetings with Aboriginal spokespeople during the summer of 1968.  Aboriginal people felt that Andras understood their issues and would make a difference in Indian policy compared to previous bureaucratic rhetoric, but Andras did not have the opportunity to push the agenda forward.

Andras did not run for re-election in the 1980 election. He died November 17, 1982, at his Vancouver home from cancer.

Sources

External links
 

1921 births
1982 deaths
Anglophone Quebec people
Liberal Party of Canada MPs
Members of the 20th Canadian Ministry
Members of the House of Commons of Canada from Ontario
Members of the King's Privy Council for Canada
People from Lachine, Quebec
Politicians from Montreal
Deaths from cancer in British Columbia